The following is an incomplete list of industrial music festivals, which encapsulates music festivals focused on industrial music. The list may have some overlap with list of electronic music festivals, list of gothic festivals, and list of heavy metal festivals. Industrial music is a genre of experimental music that draws on transgressive and provocative themes. The term was coined in the mid-1970s,  and precursors included acts such as electronic group Kraftwerk, experimental rock acts such as The Velvet Underground and Frank Zappa, psychedelic rock artists such as Jimi Hendrix, and composers such as John Cage. AllMusic defines industrial as the "most abrasive and aggressive fusion of rock and electronic music"; "initially a blend of avant-garde electronics experiments (tape music, musique concrète, white noise, synthesizers, sequencers, etc.) and punk provocation".

Notable hybrid genres are industrial rock from the late 1970s and industrial metal from the 1980s, while electro-industrial developed in the late 1980s. Because of its genre fluidity, industrial music may be featured at rock festivals, heavy metal festivals, goth festivals, and electronic music festivals, though there are also festivals dedicated solely to industrial music. In North America in particular, electro-industrial music is often termed industrial dance, and since the late 1980s industrial music festivals often attract industrial fans termed rivetheads or cybergoths, with other countercultures such as cyberpunk and goth appearing as well. Cybergoth dance styles include rave dance styles, while more rock-focused festivals may feature dance styles such as pogoing, headbanging, and moshing. The rivethead dress code that emerged in the late 1980s is militaristic with hints of punk aesthetics and fetish fashion, while cybergoth fashion from the late 1990s combines rivethead industrial aesthetics with a style associated with "gravers" (gothic ravers).

Festivals

Gallery
The following is a gallery of music festivals focused largely on industrial music (as compared to gothic music):

See also

List of music festivals
List of electronic music festivals
List of gothic festivals
List of heavy metal festivals
 Music festivals
 Experimental music festivals 
 Industrial music festivals

References

External links

Industrial music
 Industrial
Industrial
Industrial
Industrial